The HEARTECT platform is an automobile platform that underpins various Suzuki models since 2014.



Construction 
The platform is claimed to utilize "Advanced High Tensile Steel" and "Ultra High Tensile Steel", which are intended to increase occupant safety in case of a collision. Suzuki also claims that the platform offers increased body stiffness, allowing for better ride quality and handling.

The platform is shown to utilize MacPherson strut front suspension.

Applications

Kei cars 
 Suzuki Alto / Mazda Carol (2014–present)
 Suzuki Lapin (2015–present)
 Suzuki Wagon R / Mazda Flair (2017–present)
 Suzuki Spacia / Mazda Flair Wagon (2017–present)
 Suzuki Hustler / Mazda Flair Crossover (2020–present)
 Suzuki Wagon R Smile (2021–present)

Subcompact cars 
 Suzuki Baleno / Toyota Glanza / Starlet (2015–present)
 Suzuki Solio / Mitsubishi Delica D:2 (2015–present)
 Suzuki Ignis (2016–present)
 Suzuki Swift (2016–present)
 Suzuki Dzire (2017–present)
 Suzuki Xbee (2017–present)
 Maruti Suzuki Wagon R (2019–present)
 Suzuki S-Presso (2019–present)
 Suzuki Celerio/Toyota Vitz (2021–present)
 Maruti Suzuki Alto K10 (2022–present)
 Suzuki Fronx (2023–present)

Compact cars 
 Suzuki Ertiga / Toyota Rumion (2018–present)
 Suzuki XL6/XL7 (2019–present)

References 

Suzuki HEARTECT